Greatest Hits is a compilation album of songs by the Police, released in September 1992. It is the band's second compilation album following Every Breath You Take: The Singles. In contrast with its predecessor, it features all 14 original UK top 20 chart singles and five UK number-ones released by the band from 1978 to 1984, including the two missing singles from the previous 1986 compilation, "Synchronicity II" and the original version of "Don't Stand So Close to Me" which had been replaced with the 1986 re-recording. The album also includes two bonus album tracks, "The Bed's Too Big Without You" and "Tea in the Sahara". The cover photograph was by Duane Michals and it was taken at the time of the Synchronicity album. The inner sleeve featured a collage of pictures of the band shot by different photographers during their career, including Miles Copeland, Peter Baylis, Adrian Boot, Akihiro Takayama, Anton Corbijn, Danny Quatrochi, Gabor Scott, Janette Beckman, Kim Turner, Michael Ross, Watal Asanuma and Andy Summers.

The album failed to chart in the US but spent 36 weeks on the UK Albums Chart, where it peaked at number 10. It also peaked at number one on Official New Zealand Music Chart and at number four in Norway.

In 2022, Greatest Hits was reissued for its 30th anniversary in a remastered double-LP vinyl version, resulting in its re-entry on several charts worldwide.

Critical reception
The album came out shortly after Sting's solo album The Soul Cages, prompting David Sinclair to point out in his review in Q magazine that "Copeland and Summers were far more than a passive vehicle for Sting's songs. As powerful personalities and assertive musicians in their own right, they gingered up Sting's basic ideas while putting the brakes on his tendency to earnest excess."

Track listing

Personnel
The Police
Sting – lead and backing vocals, bass, keyboards, harmonica on "So Lonely", saxophone on "Spirits in the Material World", oboe on "Tea in the Sahara"
Andy Summers – electric guitar, keyboards, backing vocals
Stewart Copeland – drums, miscellaneous percussion, keyboards, backing vocals

Additional personnel
Jean Roussel – piano on "Every Little Thing She Does Is Magic"

Charts

Certifications

References

1992 greatest hits albums
Albums produced by Hugh Padgham
The Police compilation albums
A&M Records compilation albums
Universal Music Group compilation albums
Albums produced by Nigel Gray